Chama South is a constituency of the National Assembly of Zambia. It covers a southern part of Chama as well as the towns of Chankalamu, Chipondo, Chisondi, Chitimbe, Msitu and Mwami in Chama District of Eastern Province.

List of MPs

References

Constituencies of the National Assembly of Zambia
1991 establishments in Zambia
Constituencies established in 1991